Aarne Soro (born 3 February 1974 in Helme Parish) is an Estonian actor.

In 1997 he graduated from the Viljandi Culture Academy. Since 1996 he has been working at the Ugala Theatre in Viljandi. Besides stage roles he has also participated on films and television series.

Awards
 2019: ('Good Theatre Prize')

Filmography

 Head käed (2001)
 Helmut (2001)
 Vanad ja kobedad saavad jalad alla (2003)
 Stiilipidu (2005) 
 Zen läbi prügi (2007) 
 Georg (2007)
 Detsembrikuumus (2008) 
 Kartulid ja apelsinid (2013-2014, television series)
 Naabriplika (2013–2019, television series)
 Elu Hammasratastel (2018)
 Vee peal (2020)

Personal life 
Soro is married to Silvia Soro, an actress and director, and they have two daughters, Herta (2002) and Marta (2006), and a son, Artur (2015). His sister is the musician Anne Loho.

References

Living people
1974 births
Estonian male stage actors
Estonian male film actors
Estonian male television actors
21st-century Estonian male actors
People from Tõrva Parish